Elmer William McDevitt (December 9, 1887 – May 4, 1940) was an American football player and coach.  He served as the head football coach at Northwestern University from 1920 to 1921 and at the University of Denver from 1923 to 1924, compiling a career college football record of 14–15–2.

McDevitt was born on December 9, 1887, in Cloquet, Minnesota. He attended Duluth Central High School and Phillips Academy in Andover, Massachusetts for prep school.  He then attended Yale University, where he played on the Yale Bulldogs football team as a guard in 1910 and 1911, before graduating in 1912.

In 1912 McDevitt served as field coach for the Yale football team before joining the Navy football team as line coach late in the season.  He coach the linemen for the Minnesota Golden Gophers football team in 1913. In 1914 he moved to Northwestern as line coach.  McDevitt assisted Fred J. Murphy at the University of Denver in 1922 before succeeding him as head football coach the following season.  McDevitt practiced law in Duluth, Minnesota at the time.

Head coaching record

References

External links
 

1887 births
1940 deaths
20th-century American lawyers
American football guards
Denver Pioneers football coaches
Minnesota Golden Gophers football coaches
Navy Midshipmen football coaches
Northwestern Wildcats football coaches
Yale Bulldogs football coaches
Yale Bulldogs football players
Phillips Academy alumni
People from Cloquet, Minnesota
Sportspeople from Duluth, Minnesota
Coaches of American football from Minnesota
Players of American football from Duluth, Minnesota
Minnesota lawyers